Briand is a surname, and may refer to:

 Anne Briand (born 1968), French athlete
 Aristide Briand (1862–1932), Prime Minister of France and Nobel Peace Prize winner
 Ben Briand (born 1980), Australian film director
 Bernard Briand (born 1974), French politician
 Françoise Briand (born 1951), deputy in the French National Assembly
 Jean-Olivier Briand (1715–1794), Roman Catholic bishop of Quebec
 Jimmy Briand (born 1985), French football player
 Ludwig Briand (born 1981), French actor
 Pascal Briand (born 1976),  French speed skater
 Philippe Briand (born 1950), deputy in the French National Assembly
 

Surnames of French origin
French-language surnames